The Angel of Sin (Italian: L'angelo del peccato) is a 1952 Italian drama film directed by Leonardo De Mitri and Vittorio Carpignano and starring Roldano Lupi,  Gaby André and Luigi Tosi. The film's sets were designed by the art director Arrigo Equini.

Cast
 Roldano Lupi as 	Conte
 Gaby André as 	Elena
 Luigi Tosi as Bruno
 Maria Grazia Francia as 	Annetta
 Umberto Spadaro as Scarpone
 André Le Gall as	Tore
 Mario Mazza as 	Don Fabio
 Violetta Gragnani as	Maria Rosa 
 Guglielmo Ferro as 	Lunardo - padre di Bruno
 Renato Lupi as 	L'amministratore
 Anna Parisi as La Perpetua
 Riccardo Ferri as Grippa - marito di Maria Rosa
 Daniele Danielli as 	Medico

References

Bibliography 
 Chiti, Roberto & Poppi, Roberto. Dizionario del cinema italiano: Dal 1945 al 1959. Gremese Editore, 1991.

External links 
 

1952 films
Italian drama films
1952 drama films
1950s Italian-language films
Films directed by Leonardo De Mitri
1950s Italian films

it:L'angelo del peccato